Cecilia Douglas (née Douglas) (28 February 1772 – 25 July 1862) was an important slave owner, art collector and philanthropist from Glasgow, Scotland. A very wealthy woman (worth c. £40,000), her fortune was derived from slavery in the Caribbean.

Early life 

Cecilia Douglas was born to John Douglas, a West Indian merchant, and Cecilia Buchanan on 28 February 1772. She was the fifth of 11 siblings, and one of only two daughters.

Marriage 
Douglas married Gilbert Douglas, a rich West Indian plantation owner from Balcony, on 26 January 1794, in Glasgow. Their marriage lasted until Gilbert's death in 1807. No children resulted from the union. 

Gilbert owned two plantations: Fairfield, a cotton plantation in Demerara, and Mount Pleasant, a sugar plantation on the island of St. Vincent.

Later life 
After the death of Gilbert in 1807, she inherited half shares in his plantations and enslaved people in St Vincent and Demerara. Her late husband also bequeathed her the use of estates in Lanarkshire in Scotland, Douglas Park and Boggs.

In the 1820s she toured Europe, acquiring a variety of artworks and made profitable investments in British industry and commerce.

Douglas lived at Orbiston House for the remainder of her years. She commissioned a stained-glass window in Glasgow Cathedral to preserve her own and her family's legacy. This has since been removed.

Death 
Douglas died at Orbiston House on 25 July 1862. She bequeathed her entire art collection to Glasgow Corporation. Some of the paintings are displayed in the Kelvingrove Art Gallery and Museum, Glasgow.

References 

1772 births
1862 deaths
Scottish slave owners
Women slave owners
Scottish philanthropists
19th-century Scottish businesspeople
19th-century British businesswomen